Louis Ng Kok Kwang (born 8 December 1978) is a Singaporean politician, animal and environmental activist. A member of the governing People's Action Party (PAP), he has been the Member of Parliament (MP) representing the Nee Soon East division of Nee Soon GRC since 2015. He is also the founder of ACRES.

Education
Ng attended St. Gabriel's Secondary School and Catholic Junior College before graduating from the National University of Singapore in 2002 with a Bachelor of Science degree in biology. He also completed a Master of Science degree in primate conservation at Oxford Brookes University.

Career
While still an undergraduate in 2001, Ng founded Animal Concerns Research and Education Society (ACRES), an animal protection organisation aimed at fostering a spirit of volunteerism and working with the community to create much-needed awareness on animal protection issues. Upon graduating from the National University of Singapore in 2002, he began full-time work in ACRES, leading ACRES from a volunteer-run organisation to one with over 20 full-time staff and over S$1 million in funding in 2014.

Political career
On 26 August 2015, the governing People's Action Party (PAP) announced that Ng would be part of a five-member PAP team contesting in Nee Soon GRC in the 2015 general election. Ng was elected into Parliament following the after the five-member PAP team won 66.83% of the vote. On 24 August 2020, he was appointed as Chair of the Government Parliamentary Committee for Sustainability and Environment in the 14th Parliament.

In March 2021, the Singapore police announced they were investigating Ng for a possible offense under the Public Order Act of organising a public assembly without a permit. The alleged offense occurred when Ng visited a hawker centre in 2020 and held up a placard calling for the public to support hawkers. The Public Order Act makes it an offense to take part in a public assembly without a police permit. According to the Straits Times, "Under the Act, an 'assembly' means a gathering or meeting with the purpose of demonstrating support for, or opposing the views or actions of any person, group or government. It also applies to publicising a cause or campaign, marking or commemorating any event, and includes a demonstration by a person alone." In October 2022, the Attorney-General's Chambers announced that the investigation had concluded and no further action would be taken against Ng, stating: "Investigations have revealed that Mr Ng was exercising his duty as a Member of Parliament, in expressing care and support for the welfare of the hawkers in his constituency during the COVID-19 pandemic."

Awards
 In 2002, Ng received the HSBC/NYAA Youth Environmental (Merit) Award.
 In 2007, Ng was presented with The Outstanding Young Persons of Singapore Award.
 On 5 August 2011, Ng received the Yahoo! Singapore 9 Award (NGO category) which recognises 9 influential and inspiring Singaporeans from the past year.
 On 30 August 2014, Ng was awarded Advocate of the Year at the inaugural Singapore Advocacy Awards.

Personal life
Ng's father, Robert Ng, is a division manager in an equipment firm, while his mother, Angela Quek, is a retired civil servant. He has an elder sister.

Ng's love for animals started when he was a child. He would go to Ang Mo Kio library after school and borrow books with animal themes. Wanting to become a veterinarian when he was younger, he volunteered with the Society for the Prevention of Cruelty to Animals and at the zoo. 

At the age of 14, he gave up eating turtle soup, shark's fin and stingray, after watching TV shows about animals' protection. In 2000, he became a full vegetarian. His wife Amy Corrigan and daughter Ella are both vegetarian as well.

When he set up the animal welfare group ACRES in 2001, his parents were worried about his future. His father "could not see a career in ACRES" as he was just drawing a monthly salary of S$500. However, both parents were supportive.

References

External links
 Louis Ng on Parliament of Singapore

1978 births
Living people
Members of the Parliament of Singapore
Catholic Junior College alumni
National University of Singapore alumni
Alumni of Oxford Brookes University
People's Action Party politicians
Singaporean politicians of Chinese descent
Animal welfare workers